The Jizhaoying Mosque is a mosque in Xuanwu District, Nanjing, Jiangsu, China.

History
The prayer hall of the mosque was rebuilt in 1912. In 1987, the mosque underwent renovation with funds raised by the Urban Islamic Association in Nanjing.

Architecture
The current building of the mosque was designed by architect Ma Xiaodong. The mosque complex covers an area of 815.1 m2. It has a total of 4 floors which consists of guardroom, kitchen, meeting hall, restroom, main prayer hall, shower room, ablution room, reception room, imam's office, meeting room and the mosque staffs office.

Transportation
The mosque is accessible within walking distance northeast of Zhujianglu Station of Nanjing Metro.

See also
 Islam in China
 List of mosques in China

References

Mosques in Nanjing